CAMC may refer to:

 Charleston Area Medical Center, a complex of hospitals in Charleston, West Virginia
 Carlsberg Meridian Telescope, formerly known as the Carlsberg Automatic Meridian Circle
 Computer-Aided Manufacturing Capability
 Committee on the American Mathematics Competitions, the organization that oversees the American Mathematics Competitions
 A brand name of Chinese truck manufacturer Hualing Xingma